The Bergen Tunnels are a pair of railroad tunnels with open cuts running parallel to each other under Bergen Hill in Jersey City, New Jersey, U.S. Originally built by the Delaware, Lackawanna and Western Railroad (DL&W), they are used by New Jersey Transit Rail Operations (NJT) trains originating or terminating at Hoboken Terminal.

Construction

Prior to construction, the Morris and Essex Railroad, a predecessor of the DL&W, used the Long Dock Tunnel, owned by the Erie Railroad, to pass under the Hudson Palisades. After issues of congestion and competition arose, the DL&W decided to build its own tunnel for what is commonly known as its Morristown Line. Construction of the North Bergen Tunnel began in 1873; it came into service in 1877. The South Bergen Tunnel opened in 1910, soon after a new Hoboken Terminal was inaugurated. 

Rehabilitation

In 2001, New Jersey Transit contracted JV Merco-Obayashi for the rehabilitation of the  partially brick-lined North Bergen Tunnel. This included the stabilization of the two open cuts. The five ventilation shafts were stabilized and backfilled. Brick was removed so that the tunnel could be enlarged using drill-and-blast methods, following which it was relined with shotcrete. A drained membrane waterproofing system was installed before a final lining of concrete was cast-in-place. In addition to waterproofing ceilings and walls, new electrical, signal and ventilation systems were installed as were new emergency exits. New tracks were affixed directly to a new concrete floor.

Historic status
The tunnels are part of New Jersey's state historic preservation office historic district, designated the Old Main Delaware, Lackawanna and Western Railroad Historic District. They were documented in 2001 for the Historic American Engineering Record.

See also
List of bridges, tunnels, and cuts in Hudson County, New Jersey
Timeline of Jersey City, New Jersey-area railroads

References

External links 

 Delaware, Lackawanna and Western Railroad, North Bergen Tunnel (1877) 
Delaware, Lackawanna and Western Railroad, South Bergen Tunnel 1911

NJ Transit Rail Operations
Delaware, Lackawanna and Western Railroad tunnels
Railroad tunnels in New Jersey
Transportation in Jersey City, New Jersey
Tunnels completed in 1877
Tunnels completed in 1910
Tunnels in Hudson County, New Jersey
1877 establishments in New Jersey